Beibit Zhukayev (born 12 October 2000) is a Kazakhstani tennis player.

Zhukayev has a career high ATP singles ranking of 315 achieved on 21 November 2022. He also has a career high ATP doubles ranking of 327 achieved on 3 October 2022.

Zhukayev made his ATP main draw debut at the 2022 Astana Open after receiving a wildcard for the singles and doubles main draws. He was then defeated by Botic van de Zandschulp in the first round.

References

External links

2000 births
Living people
Kazakhstani male tennis players
People from Aktau
21st-century Kazakhstani people